Querencia is a metaphysical concept in the Spanish language. The term comes from the Spanish verb "querer," which means "to desire." It has also been defined as "homing instinct, a favorite place" Larousse Gran Diccionario Español InglésEnglish Spanish (1994).

The other meaning is; It means the place where people feel most secure, gain the strength of their character and feel at home.

In bullfighting, a bull may stake out his querencia, a certain part of the bull ring where he feels strong and safe.  Ernest Hemingway's 1932 nonfiction book Death in the Afternoon describes the querencia in this context:

References

Relevant literature
Vanessa Fonseca-Chávez, Levi Romero, and Spencer R. Herrera, eds. 2020. Querencia Reflections: on the New Mexico Homeland.  Albuquerque: University of New Mexico Press. 
Arrellano, Juan Estevan. 1997. "La Querencia: La Raza Bioregionalism." New Mexico Historical Review 72: 31-37.

Spanish words and phrases